Massachusetts House of Representatives' 3rd Bristol district in the United States is one of 160 legislative districts included in the lower house of the Massachusetts General Court. It covers part of Bristol County. Carol Doherty has represented the district since summer 2020.

Towns represented
The district includes the following localities:
 part of Easton
 part of Taunton

The current district geographic boundary overlaps with those of the Massachusetts Senate's Norfolk, Bristol and Plymouth and 1st Plymouth and Bristol districts.

Former locales
The district previously covered Raynham, circa 1872.

Representatives
 Horace D. Howard, circa 1858 
 John D. G. Williams, circa 1859 
 Rollin H. Babbitt, circa 1888 
 Frederick Stanley Hall, circa 1888 
 William L. White, circa 1888 
 Matthew A. Higgins, circa 1920 
 Francis X. Casey, circa 1951 
 Thomas D. Lopes, circa 1975 
 Theodore J. Aleixo Jr.
 Marc R. Pacheco, January 1989 – January 1993
 James H. Fagan, 1993–2011
 Shaunna L. O'Connell, 2011-January 2020
 Carol Doherty, 2020-current

See also
 List of Massachusetts House of Representatives elections
 Other Bristol County districts of the Massachusetts House of Representatives: 1st, 2nd,  4th, 5th, 6th, 7th, 8th, 9th, 10th, 11th, 12th, 13th, 14th
 List of Massachusetts General Courts
 List of former districts of the Massachusetts House of Representatives

Images

References

External links
 Ballotpedia
  (State House district information based on U.S. Census Bureau's American Community Survey).

House
Government of Bristol County, Massachusetts